Lazarus Shinyemba Ipangelwa was a prominent Namibian businessman and former Chief Executive Officer of First National Bank (Namibia), born on 20 June 1955 in Omagongati, Oshana Region. Ipangelwa became the first local black person to head a commercial bank in Namibia when he was appointed in March 2003. He also served as the Vice President of the Namibia Chamber of Commerce and Industry, and he was also Deputy Governor of Bank of Namibia prior to joining FNB.

Education and career

Lazarus Shinyemba started school at Omagongati Primary School, before moving to Mweshipandeka High School. He studied for an MBA in International Banking & Finance at the University of Birmingham, United Kingdom. He had a Management Certificate – National Institute of Bank Management, Pune, India / AMP – Templeton College, University of Oxford, UK / Financial Management Certificate – Sando U, Centrum, Sweden. He worked for Bank of Namibia from 1991 to 2002 in various capacities, including being the deputy governor. In July 2002 Lazarus joined First National Bank as CEO Designate, where his initial responsibility was to coordinate the planned merger between Swabou Group and FNB. In March 2003 he was appointed as CEO of FNB, which, as a result of the merger, a few months later became FNB Namibia Holdings Ltd. The merger was successfully completed and the FNB Namibia Group of Companies formed under his leadership.

Personal life and death
Ipangelwa died on 7 September 2005 in a car crash after his Mercedes-Benz veered off the road and overturned between Otjiwarongo and Otavi road. His son Simson Ipangelwa and the domestic worker Elizabeth Kuluku Nuuyoma were also killed after the accident. His daughter Tashiya Ipangelwa survived and she was in a stable condition after the accident. His mysterious death shocked the entire nation.

The Lazarus Shinyemba Ipangelwa (LSI) Foundation
A non-profitable foundation in his name was launched in June 2007  which recognizes and encourages excellence in business leadership. The Foundation provides training and mentoring programmes to students, graduates and emerging entrepreneurs. The Foundation was created in memory of Lazarus Shinyemba Ipangelwa. It also aim to celebrate this exceptional business leader who made great contributions to Namibia, especially within the business community.as he helped create a foundation upon which others can follow.

References

1955 births
2005 deaths